Eka is a town in Jasrana Tehsil, pincode 283152 Firozabad district, Uttar Pradesh, India.

The town was formerly part of Mainpuri district but upon establishment of the new district of Firozabad on 5 February 1989 the town was constituted under Firozabad. Eka is located on a link road that connects National Highway 2 NH2 from Shikohabad to National Highway 91 NH91 from Etah. The nearest railway station is Shikohabad (35 km) and the nearest international airport is New Delhi (approximately 280 km). Agra, home of the Taj Mahal, is 80 km from Eka.

Villages in Firozabad district